Ruby is an unincorporated community in Seward County, Nebraska, United States.

History
A post office was established at Ruby in 1883, and remained in operation until it was discontinued in 1905.

References

Unincorporated communities in Seward County, Nebraska
Unincorporated communities in Nebraska